The 2002 European Individual Speedway Junior Championship was the fifth edition of the Championship.

Qualification
Scandinavian Final (Semi-Final A):
May 25, 2002
 Elgane
Semi-Final B:
May 30, 2002
 Olching
Semi-Final C:
June 2, 2002
 Daugavpils

Final
August 25, 2002
 Daugavpils, Spidveja Centrs

References

2002
Euro I J